Joseph Millington Lloyd (30 September 1910 – 1 April 1996) was a Welsh professional footballer who played as a left-half. He made appearances in the English Football League with Welsh clubs Swansea City and Wrexham.

He retired in 1947 after his one-year spell at Wrexham.

References

1910 births
1996 deaths
Welsh footballers
Association football defenders
Connah's Quay F.C. players
Everton F.C. players
Swansea City A.F.C. players
Wrexham A.F.C. players
English Football League players
People from Connah's Quay
Sportspeople from Flintshire